Chả is Vietnamese for "sausage", referring to the Vietnamese types of sausage. Other types of sausage have different names: xúc xích refers to the pork-based Western "hot dog", and "lạp xưởng" refers to Chinese sausages, sweeter in flavour than the former two. 

Chả can be made of several types of fillers:

 pork (chả lụa)
 deep-fried pork (chả chiên)
 deep-fried cinnamon-flavored pork sausage (chả quế)
 ground chicken (chả gà)
 ground beef (chả bò)
 fish (chả cá)
 tofu or vegetarian (chả chay)
 steamed pork loaf topped with egg yolks (chả trứng hấp)

See also

 Chả lụa
 List of sausages

Vietnamese sausages